Yang Sung-hsien (born October 6, 1977) is a Taiwanese baseball player who currently plays for Uni-President 7-Eleven Lions of Chinese Professional Baseball League. He currently plays as left fielder for the Lions. Yang was banned from playing in CPBL for protesting the Chinatrust Whales' management in 2003. The ban was lifted in 2005 with the helps of Uni-President Lions, La New Bears, and Chinatrust Whales under a new general manager; the three organization contested the 2003 decision of the league, and successfully lifted the ban.

See also
 Chinese Professional Baseball League
 Uni-President Lions

References

1977 births
Living people
Uni-President 7-Eleven Lions players
Baseball players from Tainan
Asian Games medalists in baseball
Baseball players at the 1998 Asian Games
Baseball players at the 2002 Asian Games
Medalists at the 1998 Asian Games
Asian Games bronze medalists for Chinese Taipei
Medalists at the 2002 Asian Games
Asian Games silver medalists for Chinese Taipei